This list of places on Öland contains places on the Swedish island Öland.

A

B

D

E

F

G

H

I

K

L

M

N

O

P 
 Persnäs

R

S

T

U 
 Uggletorp

V 

Oland
Öland